The Wendell Boulevard Historic District is a national historic district located at Wendell, North Carolina, a town in eastern Wake County. The residential district encompasses 74 contributing buildings built between about 1890 and 1958.  It includes notable examples of Colonial Revival and Bungalow / American Craftsman style architecture.  Notable buildings include the Wendell Baptist Church (1937), Wendell United Methodist Church (1923), and a service station (1958).

The district was listed on the National Register of Historic Places in 2009.

References

Historic districts on the National Register of Historic Places in North Carolina
Colonial Revival architecture in North Carolina
Geography of Wake County, North Carolina
National Register of Historic Places in Wake County, North Carolina